

Regular season
Jenny Potter set an NCAA record (since tied) for most goals in one game with 6. This was accomplished on December 18, 2002 versus St. Cloud State.
February 22: Maria Rooth set the Bulldogs record for most points in a career. During the game against Bemidji State Rooth scored one goal and one assist to claim the record. She ended the season with 232 total points including 119 goals.
February 23: The Bulldogs clinch the WCHA regular season title. The Bulldogs defeat Bemidji State to accomplish the milestone.

Player stats
Note: GP= Games played; G= Goals; A= Assists; PTS = Points; GW = Game Winning Goals; PPL = Power Play Goals; SHG = Short Handed Goals

Postseason

March 8: The Bulldogs earned their third WCHA Final Five title with a win over Minnesota (5–3). 
March 23: UMD make women's hockey history as the Bulldogs win their third straight NCAA Frozen Four tournament. The Bulldogs defeat Harvard in a double overtime win 4–3. The game was held in Duluth, MN in front of the largest crowd in women's hockey NCAA history (5,167). Nora Tallus scored the game winner 4:19 into the second overtime.

Awards and honors
November 11: Patricia Sautter was USCHO Defensive Player of the Week and WCHA Defensive Player of the Week. Sautter shut out Ohio State twice (Nov. 8 & Nov. 9).
December 3: Tricia Guest was USCHO Offensive Player of the Week tallying four points.
December 10: Jenny Potter, USCHO Offensive Player of the Week.
January 14: Caroline Ouellette, USCHO Offensive Player of the Week (the third Bulldog to gain the honor in the season). 
January 28: Maria Rooth becomes the fourth player to gain USCHO Offensive Player of the Week honors.
March 6: Jenny Potter, Caroline Ouellette, and Krista McArthur were named to the All-WCHA First Team 
Maria Rooth and Erika Holst were All-WCHA Second Team selection.
Caroline Ouellette and Krista McArthur were WCHA All-Rookie Team selections.
Seven Bulldogs were recognized as WCHA All-Academic: Erika Holst, Satu Kiipeli, Michelle McAteer, Jenny Potter, Maria Rooth, Patricia Sautter and Juliane Vasichek.
March 7: Jenny Potter was named a Patty Kazmaier Award Finalist for the second time in her career.
March 8: Erika Holst, WCHA All-Tournament team. 
Patricia Sautter, WCHA All-Tournament team.
Caroline Ouellette, WCHA tournament Most Valuable Player.
March 23:  Jenny Potter and Hanne Sikio were named to the Frozen Four All-Tournament team
Caroline Ouellette was named the Frozen Four tournament Most Valuable Player.
March 23: Jenny Potter, First Team All-American honors (second time in her career).
 Maria Rooth, Second Team All-American.

Postseason
The Bulldogs coaching staff was named the American Association of College Coaches' women's hockey coaching staff of the year.
June 17: The Bulldogs were honored for the third time at the White House by President George W. Bush.

References

External links
Official site

Minnesota-Duluth
NCAA women's ice hockey Frozen Four seasons
NCAA women's ice hockey championship seasons
Minnesota Duluth Bulldogs women's ice hockey seasons